Criorhina villosa is a species of hoverfly in the family Syrphidae.

Distribution
Mexico.

References

Eristalinae
Diptera of North America
Hoverflies of North America
Insects described in 1882
Taxa named by Jacques-Marie-Frangile Bigot